Cram (stylised as CRAM!) was an Australian game show hosted by Peter Helliar, which premiered on Network Ten on 2 November 2017 until 14 December 2017.

The premiere was negatively received by viewers, with ratings dwindling as the season progressed and the show rating outside of the top 20 shows of the day for the season finale.

On 9 November 2017, Channel Ten announced at their yearly upfronts event that the show would return for a second season in 2018, after only one episode of the first season had aired. However, a second season never materialised.

The first season did not secure a spot in the top 100 watched free-to-air shows in 2017.

Format
The format pits two teams of comedians and celebrities tested on their memories across general knowledge categories. Each category will be introduced with a “cram”: a brief video on any subject. The team that recalls the most facts is the winner. The teams are captained by comedian Dilruk Jayasinha and actress Virginia Gay.

Episodes

Awards and nominations

References

External links

Network 10 original programming
2010s Australian game shows
Australian comedy television series
2017 Australian television series debuts
2017 Australian television series endings
English-language television shows